Jerome is a masculine name of Greek origin, derived from the Greek given name , Hierōnymos, "sacred name"; from ἱερός, hierós, "sacred", and ὄνυμα, ónyma, an alternative form of ὄνομα, ónoma, "name".

It is the name of a prominent Christian saint, Saint Jerome, the translator of the Vulgate.

Jerome ranked among the top 200 names given to boys born in the United States between 1903 and 1985. Since then its use has declined and the name was ranked 616th as the name given to American boys born in 2008.

Variants

Italian: Gerolamo, Geronimo, Girolamo
English: Gerome, Jerome
Sicilian: Girolamo
Greek: Ιερώνυμος (Ieronymos) 
Latin and German: Hieronymus 
Western Frisian: Hiëronymus 
Galician and Spanish: Xerónimo
Albanian: Jeronim 
Czech: Jeroným 
Croatian: Jerolim, Jeronim 
Hungarian: Jeromos 
Slovak: Hieronym, Hieroným 
Slovene: Hieronim
Irish: Iaróm 
Welsh: Sierôm 
Medieval Latin: Ieronimus 
Lithuanian: Jeronimas 
Latvian: Hieronīms 
Dutch: Jeroen 
French: Jérôme 
Maltese: Ġlormu 
Esperanto: Hieronimo 
Spanish: Jerónimo, Gerónimo
Portuguese: Jerônimo 
Catalan: Jeroni, Jerònim 
Galician: Xerome, Xeromo
Polish: Hieronim
Japanese: Hiro

List of people with this given name
 Jerome, 4th Count de Salis-Soglio (1771–1836), Anglo-Grison noble and Irish landowner
Jérôme Anthony (born 1968), French television presenter
Jerome Baker (disambiguation), multiple people
Jerome Gautier Balthazar, Sri Lankan Burgher army brigadier
Jerome Barkum (born 1950), American football player
Jerome Bettis (born 1972), American football player
Jerome Bixby (1923–1998), American writer
Jérôme Boateng (born 1988), German football player
Jérôme Bonaparte (1784–1860), King of Westphalia, brother of Napoleon Bonaparte
Jerome "Jerry" Brudos (1939–2006), American serial killer, rapist, and necrophile
Jerome Bruner (1915–2016), American psychologist
Jerome Bwanausi (born 1959), Tanzanian politician
Jerome Couplin (born 1991), American football player
Jerome Cowan (1897–1972), American actor
Jérôme d'Ambrosio (born 1985), Belgian racing driver
Jerome Dyson (born 1987), American basketball player
Jerome Ford (born 1999), American football player
Jerome Flynn (born 1963), British actor
Jerome Fontamillas (born 1967), American musician
Jerome Frank (1889–1957), American judge and legal philosopher
Jerome Frank (psychiatrist) (1909–2005), American psychiatrist
Jerome Garcia (1942–1995), American musician
Jerome Isaac Friedman (born 1930), American physicist, 1990 Nobel Physics laureate
Jerome "Curly" Howard (1903–1952), American comedian 
Jerome K. Jerome (1859–1927), British author
Jerome Kagan (1929–2021), American psychologist
Jerome Karle (1918–2013), American chemist
Jerome Kern (1885–1945), American composer
Jerome Kohl (1946–2020), American musicologist
Jerome "Jerry" Kuehl, (1931-2018), historian and tv producer
Jerome H. Lemelson (1923–1997), American inventor
Jerome Meyinsse (born 1988), American basketball player in the Israeli Basketball Premier League
Jérôme Moïso (born 1978), French basketball player
Jerome K. Moore, American artist
Jerome Arthur Pechillo (1919–1991), American missionary and Catholic bishop
Jerome Powell (born 1953), chair of the Federal Reserve
Jérôme Pradon, French actor and singer
 Jerome Prince (legal scholar), American attorney, academic administrator, and legal scholar
 Jerome Prince (politician), mayor of Gary, Indiana
Jerome "Pooh" Richardson (born 1966), American basketball player
Jerome Robbins (1918–1998), American director 
Jerome B. Robertson (1815–1890), American doctor, politician and Confederate general
Jérôme Rothen (born 1978), French footballer
Jerome T. Youngman (born 1951), American musician
Jerome Salinger (1919–2010), American author
Jerome Seinfeld (born 1954), American comedian
Jerome Silberman (Gene Wilder), American actor, comedian, writer and filmmaker
Jerome B. Simandle (born 1949), American federal judge
Jerome Tuccille, American libertarian writer and activist
Jérôme Valcke (born 1960) French football administrator
Jerome Vered (born 1958), American television contestant
Jerome Wiesner (1915–1994), American science advisor and educator
Jerome J. Workman Jr. (born 1952), American biological chemist
 Jerome of Périgord, (died 1120), French monk and bishop in Spain
 Jerome of Prague (1379–1416), Czech church reformer and follower of Jan Hus
 Jerome Foster II (born 2002), African-American environmental activist, voting rights advocate, and virtual reality developer.
 Jerome of Sandy Cove (c.1835–1912), unidentifiable amputee discovered in Nova Scotia in 1863

Notes

Masculine given names
English masculine given names
German masculine given names
French masculine given names
Given names of Greek language origin